Radvilė Morkūnaitė-Mikulėnienė (née Morkūnaitė; born 2 January 1984) is a Lithuanian politician. She has served as a Member of the Seimas since 2016, and has additionally served as Deputy Speaker of the Seimas since 2020 and as First Vice Chairwoman of the Homeland Union since 2021.

History

Prior to entering the Lithuanian parliament, Morkūnaitė-Mikulėnienė served as a member of the European Parliament for the European People's Party from 2009 until 2014, representing Lithuania. Between 2016 and 2020, she served as the parliamentary group's deputy chair and since 2020 as group's chair.

References

1984 births
Living people
Politicians from Kaunas
MEPs for Lithuania 2009–2014
Homeland Union MEPs
Women MEPs for Lithuania
Women members of the Seimas
European People's Party politicians
Homeland Union politicians

21st-century Lithuanian politicians
21st-century Lithuanian women politicians
Members of the Seimas